Kenneth David Tiler (born 23 May 1950) is an English former professional footballer who played in the Football League, as a right back.

References

1950 births
Living people
Footballers from Sheffield
English footballers
Association football defenders
Chesterfield F.C. players
Brighton & Hove Albion F.C. players
Rotherham United F.C. players
Boston United F.C. players
Gainsborough Trinity F.C. players
English Football League players
National League (English football) players